The Sculptor in Ordinary for Scotland is a member of the Royal household in Scotland. The first appointment was made by Queen Victoria around 1838, although it was not listed as a member of the Royal household until the 1870s. The office was made permanent in 1921.

Office holders
 1838–1891: Sir John Steell
 1881–1890: Sir Joseph Edgar Boehm
 1921–1938: Dr. James Pittendrigh Macgillivray
 1938–1961: Sir William Reid Dick
 1963–1984: Benno Schotz
 1986–2005: Sir Eduardo Paolozzi
 2008–    : Alexander Stoddart

References

Positions within the British Royal Household
Scottish royalty
 
1838 establishments in Scotland